Magdalena "Magda" Forsberg (née Wallin; born 25 July 1967) is a Swedish former cross-country skier and biathlete. She was the dominating female biathlete from 1997 to 2002, when she retired, winning the Biathlon World Cup for six years straight. She is also a six-times world champion, a two-times Olympic bronze medalist, and holds the record for the most World Cup victories in women's biathlon.

She has been married to Henrik Forsberg, also a biathlete and cross-country skier,  since mid-1996.

Cross-country skiing
Forsberg competed as a cross country skier from 1988 to 1996, participating in the World Cup. Her best results at the Winter Olympics were in Albertville in 1992 where she finished seventh in the 4 × 5 km relay and 26th in the 15 km event.

Forsberg's best individual finish at the FIS Nordic World Ski Championships was tenth in the 30 km event at Lahti in 1989. In 1987 she was in the Swedish team that finished third in the 4 × 5 km relay. Her best World cup finish was second in a 10 km event in Finland in 1988.

She participated as a celebrity dancer in Let's Dance 2019, which was broadcast on TV4. She placed second.

Biathlon

Competing from 1993 to 2002, Forsberg won six straight overall wins in the Biathlon World Cup from 1997 to 2002. She also won six gold medals in the World Championships, became runner-up once, and placed third five times. At the 2002 Winter Olympic Games, Forsberg won two bronze medals. In her career she managed a total of 42 individual Biathlon World Cup wins, which is more than any other female biathlete to date.

Magdalena Forsberg retired from active sports after the 2001–02 season. After being retired for four years she made a temporary comeback in April 2006 due to losing a bet. The bet said Forsberg would enter the Swedish Championship in Women's Relay with fellow biathlon skier Anna Carin Olofsson-Zidek if the latter won an Olympic gold in Turin. The duo went on to win the competition, Forsberg outrunning her competitors in the first leg and Olofsson extending their lead in the second.

During large parts of her career, Forsberg was trained by Wolfgang Pichler, who later took over as coach of the national Swedish biathlon team.

Other honours
Forsberg competed at the 1998 Winter Olympics both as a biathlete and as a cross country skier. She is the only Swedish athlete to have been awarded the Jerring Award four times.

Biathlon results
All results are sourced from the International Biathlon Union.

Olympic Games
2 medals (2 bronze)

*Pursuit was added as an event in 2002.

World Championships
12 medals (6 gold, 1 silver, 5 bronze)

*During Olympic seasons competitions are only held for those events not included in the Olympic program.
**Team was removed as an event in 1998, and pursuit was added in 1997 with mass start being added in 1999.

Individual victories
42 victories (7 In, 13 Sp, 19 Pu, 3 MS)

*Results are from UIPMB and IBU races which include the Biathlon World Cup, Biathlon World Championships and the Winter Olympic Games.

Cross-country skiing results

All results are sourced from the International Ski Federation (FIS).

Olympic Games

World Championships
 1 medal – (1 bronze)

World Cup

Season standings

Individual podiums

1 podium

Team podiums

 2 podiums

Note:  Until the 1999 World Championships, World Championship races were included in the World Cup scoring system.

References

External links

 
 Women's 4 x 5 km cross-country relay Olympic results: 1976-2002 

1967 births
Living people
People from Kramfors Municipality
Cross-country skiers from Västernorrland County
Swedish female biathletes
Swedish female cross-country skiers
Cross-country skiers at the 1992 Winter Olympics
Biathletes at the 1998 Winter Olympics
Cross-country skiers at the 1998 Winter Olympics
Biathletes at the 2002 Winter Olympics
Olympic biathletes of Sweden
Olympic cross-country skiers of Sweden
Medalists at the 2002 Winter Olympics
Olympic medalists in biathlon
Olympic bronze medalists for Sweden
Biathlon World Championships medalists
FIS Nordic World Ski Championships medalists in cross-country skiing
Holmenkollen Ski Festival winners